is a prefecture of Japan located in the Kantō region of Honshu. Its geographic area of  makes it fifth-smallest. Kanagawa Prefecture borders Tokyo to the north, Yamanashi Prefecture to the northwest and Shizuoka Prefecture to the west.

Yokohama is the capital and largest city of Kanagawa Prefecture and the second-largest city in Japan, with other major cities including Kawasaki, Sagamihara, and Fujisawa. Kanagawa Prefecture is located on Japan's eastern Pacific coast on Tokyo Bay and Sagami Bay, separated by the Miura Peninsula, across from Chiba Prefecture on the Bōsō Peninsula. Kanagawa Prefecture is part of the Greater Tokyo Area, the most populous metropolitan area in the world, with Yokohama and many of its cities being major commercial hubs and southern suburbs of Tokyo. Kanagawa Prefecture was the political and economic center of Japan during the Kamakura period when Kamakura was the de facto capital and largest city of Japan as the seat of the Kamakura shogunate from 1185 to 1333. Kanagawa Prefecture is a popular tourist area in the Tokyo region, with Kamakura and Hakone being two popular side trip destinations.

History

The prefecture has some archaeological sites going back to the Jōmon period (around 400 BCE). About 3,000 years ago, Mount Hakone produced a volcanic explosion which resulted in Lake Ashi on the western area of the prefecture.

It is believed that the Yamato dynasty ruled this area from the 5th century onwards. In the ancient era, its plains were very sparsely inhabited.

In medieval Japan, Kanagawa was part of the provinces of Sagami and Musashi. Kamakura in central Sagami was the capital of Japan during the Kamakura period (1185–1333).

During the Edo period, the western part of Sagami Province was governed by the daimyō of Odawara Castle, while the eastern part was directly governed by the Tokugawa shogunate in Edo (modern-day Tokyo).

Commodore Matthew Perry landed in Kanagawa in 1853 and 1854 and signed the Convention of Kanagawa to force open Japanese ports to the United States. Yokohama, the largest deep-water port in Tokyo Bay, was opened to foreign traders in 1859 after several more years of foreign pressure, and eventually developed into the largest trading port in Japan. Nearby Yokosuka, closer to the mouth of Tokyo Bay, developed as a naval port and now serves as headquarters for the U.S. 7th Fleet and the fleet operations of the Japan Maritime Self-Defense Force. After the Meiji period, many foreigners lived in Yokohama City, and visited Hakone. The Meiji government developed the first railways in Japan, from Shinbashi (in Tokyo) to Yokohama in 1872.

The epicenter of the 1923 Great Kantō earthquake was deep beneath Izu Ōshima Island in Sagami Bay. It devastated Tokyo, the port city of Yokohama, surrounding prefectures of Chiba, Kanagawa, and Shizuoka, and caused widespread damage throughout the Kantō region. The sea receded as much as 400 metres from the shore at Manazuru Point, and then rushed back towards the shore in a great wall of water which swamped Mitsuishi-shima. At Kamakura, the total death toll from earthquake, tsunami, and fire exceeded 2,000 victims. At Odawara, ninety percent of the buildings collapsed immediately, and subsequent fires burned the rubble along with anything else left standing.

Yokohama, Kawasaki, and other major cities were heavily damaged by the U.S. bombing in 1945. Total Casualties amounted to more than several thousand. After the war, General Douglas MacArthur, the Supreme Commander of the Allied Powers for the Occupation of Japan, landed in Kanagawa, before moving to other areas. U.S. military bases still remain in Kanagawa, including Camp Zama (Army), Yokosuka Naval Base, Naval Air Facility Atsugi (Navy).

Demographics 

In 1945, Kanagawa was the 15th most populous prefecture in Japan, with the population of about 1.9 million. In the years after the war, the prefecture underwent rapid urbanization as a part of the Greater Tokyo Area. The population  is estimated to be 9.1 million. Kanagawa became the second most populous prefecture in 2006.

Geography

Kanagawa is a relatively small prefecture located at the southeastern corner of the Kantō Plain wedged between Tokyo on the north, the foothills of Mount Fuji on the northwest, and the Sagami Bay and Tokyo Bay on the south and east. The eastern side of the prefecture is relatively flat and heavily urbanized, including the large port cities of Yokohama and Kawasaki.

The southeastern area nearby the Miura Peninsula is less urbanized, with the ancient city of Kamakura drawing tourists to temples and shrines. The western part, bordered by Yamanashi Prefecture and Shizuoka Prefecture on the west, is more mountainous and includes resort areas like Odawara and Hakone.

, 23% of the total land area of the prefecture was designated as Natural Parks, namely the Fuji-Hakone-Izu National Park; Tanzawa-Ōyama Quasi-National Park; and Jinba Sagamiko, Manazuru Hantō, Okuyugawara, and Tanzawa-Ōyama Prefectural Natural Parks.

Topography
Topographically, the prefecture consists of three distinct areas. The mountainous western region features the Tanzawa Mountain Range and the volcano Mount Hakone. The hilly eastern region is characterized by the Tama Hills and Miura Peninsula. The central region, which surrounds the Tama Hills and Miura Peninsula, consists of flat stream terraces and low lands around major rivers including the Sagami River, Sakai River, Tsurumi River, and Tama River.

The Tama River forms much of the boundary between Kanagawa and Tokyo. The Sagami River flows through the middle of the prefecture. In the western region, the Sakawa runs through a small lowland, the Sakawa Lowland, between Mount Hakone to the west and the Ōiso Hills to the east, and flows into Sagami Bay.

The Tanzawa Mountain Range, part of the Kantō Mountain Range, contains Mount Hiru, the highest peak in the prefecture. Other mountains measure similar mid-range heights: Mount Hinokiboramaru, Mount Tanzawa,, Mount Ōmuro, Mount Himetsugi, and Mount Usu. The mountain range is lower in height southward leading to Hadano Basin to the Ōiso Hills. At the eastern foothills of the mountain range lies the Isehara Plateau and across the Sagami River the Sagamino plateau.

Cities

Nineteen cities are located in Kanagawa Prefecture.

Atsugi
Ayase
Chigasaki
Ebina
Fujisawa
Hadano
Hiratsuka
Isehara
Kamakura
Kawasaki
Minamiashigara
Miura
Odawara
Sagamihara
Yamato
Yokohama (capital)
Yokosuka
Zama
Zushi

Towns and villages

These are the towns and villages in each district:

Aikō District
Aikawa
Kiyokawa
Ashigarakami District
Kaisei
Matsuda
Nakai
Ōi
Yamakita
Ashigarashimo District
Hakone
Manazuru
Yugawara
Kōza District
Samukawa
Miura District
Hayama
Naka District
Ninomiya
Ōiso

Mergers

Festivals and events

Tama River Firework event
Yokohama Port Anniversary Festival (June)
Kamakura Festival (April)
Hiratsuka Tanabata Festival (July)
Odawara Hōjō Godai Festival (May)
Yugawara Kifune Festival (July)
Chigasaki Hamaori Festival (July)

Transportation
Kanagawa's transport network is heavily intertwined with that of Tokyo (see: Transportation in Greater Tokyo). Shin-Yokohama and Odawara stations on the Tōkaidō Shinkansen are located in the prefecture, providing high-speed rail service to Tokyo, Nagoya, Osaka, and other major cities.

Railways 
East Japan Railway Company
Tōkaidō Main Line
Nambu Line
Tsurumi Line
Yokohama Line
Negishi Line
Yokosuka Line
Sagami Line
Chūō Main Line
Central Japan Railway Company
Tokaido Shinkansen
Gotemba Line
Keikyu
Main Line
Daishi Line
Kurihama Line
Zushi Line
Odakyu
Odawara Line
Enoshima Line
Tama Line
Sagami Railway
Main Line
Izumino Line
Shin-Yokohama Line
 Tokyu
Tōyoko Line
Den-en-toshi Line
Ōimachi Line
Meguro Line
 Minatomirai Line
 Keio
Sagamihara Line
Izuhakone Railway
 Daiyūzan Line
 Enoshima Electric Railway

Subways
Yokohama Municipal Subway
Blue Line
Green Line

Monorail
Shonan Monorail

People movers
Kanazawa Seaside Line

Road

Expressway
Tōmei Expressway
Chūō Expressway
Shuto Expressway
Tokyo Bay Aqua-Line

National highways
Route 1
Route 15
Route 16
Route 20
Route 129 (Hiratsuka-Atsugi-Sagamihara)
Route 132
Route 133
Route 134
Route 135 (Shimoda–Atami-Odawara)
Route 138
Route 246 (Chiyoda, Tokyo-Kawasaki-Machida-Atsugi-Isehara-Gotenba–Numazu)
Route 255
Route 357 (Chiba–Funabashi–Daiba of Tokyo-Yokohama-Yokosuka)
Route 409
Route 412
Route 413 (Fujiyoshida–Lake Yamanaka-Sagamihara)
Route 466 (Setagaya, Tokyo-Kawasaki-Yokohama)
Route 467

Ports
Yokohama Port – International container hub port
Misaki Port – Ferry Route to Kisarazu

Education
The Kanagawa Prefectural Board of Education manages and oversees individual municipal school districts. The board of education also directly operates most of the public high schools in the prefecture.

University facilities
Kawasaki
Keio University – Shin Kawasaki Campus
Meiji University – Ikuta Campus
Senshu University – Ikuta Campus
Japan Women's University
Showa University of Music
Den-en Chofu University – Aso Ward
Nippon Medical School
St. Marianna University, School of Medicine – Miyamae
Japan Cinema School
Tokyo City University – Aso Ward
Yokohama
Tokyo Institute of Technology – Suzukakedai
Tokyo University of the Arts – Naka Ward
Yokohama National University – Hodogaya
Yokohama City University – Kanazawa Ward
Kanagawa University – Kanagawa Ward
Kanto Gakuin University – Kanazawa Ward
Toin University of Yokohama – Aoba Ward
Tsurumi University – Tsurumi Ward
Yokohama College of Commerce – Tsurumi Ward
Yokohama College of Pharmacy – Totsuka Ward
Keio University – Hiyoshi Campus
Tokyo City University – Tsuzuki Ward
Meiji Gakuin University – Totsuka Ward
Nippon Sport Science University – Aoba Ward
Toyo Eiwa University – Midori Ward
Kokugakuin University – Tama Plaza
Senzoku Gakuen College of Music
Sagamihara
Aoyama Gakuin University
Azabu University
Kitasato University
Sagami Women's University
Obirin University
Joshi University of Art and Design
Teikyo University
Yokosuka
Kanagawa Dental College
Kanagawa University of Human Services
 Hiratsuka
Tokai University – Hiratsuka Campus
Shoin University – Hiratsuka Campus
Kanagawa University
Isehara
Tokai University – Isehara Campus
Sanno University
Odawara
Kanto Gakuin University – Odawara Campus
International University of Health and Welfare
Chigasaki
Bunkyo University – Chigasaki Campus
Atsugi
Shoin University
Tokyo University of Agriculture – Atsugi Campus
Kanagawa Institute of Technology
Tokyo Polytechnic University – Atsugi Campus
Hayama
Graduate University for Advanced Studies

Sports

Facilities

Football and athletics
Nissan Stadium (International Stadium Yokohama)—in Yokohama, the final venue of 2002 FIFA World Cup, FIFA Club World Cup in 2005–2007 and 2019 Rugby World Cup
Nippatsu Mitsuzawa Stadium (Mitsuzawa Stadium)—in Yokohama, only for football
Todoroki Athletics Stadium—in Kawasaki, the final venue of 2007 IFAF World Cup (American football).
Hiratsuka Athletics Stadium

Baseball
Yokohama Stadium—for baseball (Yokohama DeNA BayStars) and hosted Australian rules football
Kawasaki Stadium—former homeground of Taiyo Whales (now Yokohama BayStars) and Lotte Orions (now Chiba Lotte Marines).
Yokosuka Stadium—home field of Shonan Searex, minor league team of Yokohama BayStars

Indoor
Yokohama Arena—also for music concert
Yokohama Cultural Gymnasium—a volleyball venue of 1964 Summer Olympics in Tokyo
Todoroki Arena—in Kawasaki and multi-purpose venue (including basketball)
Odawara Arena—2020 Kanagawa Pre-Games training facilities

Other
Enoshima Yacht Course—used for 1964 Summer Olympics.
Hakone Ekiden Course—from Tokyo to Hakone, 108.0 km, mostly on Japan National Route 1 and Route 15. Runners run on the divided route for ten parts on January 2 (to Hakone) and January 3 (to Tokyo) every year.
Lake Sagami—hosted canoeing and rowing for the 1964 Summer Olympics.

Teams

Soccer (football)
Kawasaki Frontale (Kawasaki)—Todoroki Athletics
Yokohama F. Marinos (Yokohama, Yokosuka)—Nissan Stadium
Yokohama F.C. (Yokohama)—Mitsuzawa Ballpark
Shonan Bellmare (Hiratsuka, Odawara and some cities and towns in central and western area of Kanagawa)—Hiratsuka Athletic Stadium (football) and Odawara Arena (futsal)

Baseball
Yokohama BayStars (Yokohama)—Yokohama Stadium, and Yokosuka Stadium (for its farm team, "Shonan Searex").

Basketball
Toshiba Brave Thunders Kanagawa (Kawasaki)—Todoroki Arena

Volleyball
NEC Red Rockets (Kawasaki)—Todoroki Arena

Visitors attractions and places of interest 
 Yokohama Municipal Children's Botanical Garden
 Yokohama War Cemetery
Yokohama Chinatown

Sister areas
Kanagawa Prefecture has sister relationships with these places:

 Maryland, United States (1981)
 Liaoning Province, China (1983)
 Odessa Oblast, Ukraine (1986)
 Baden-Württemberg, Germany (1989)
 Gyeonggi Province, Republic of Korea (1990)
 City of Gold Coast, Australia (1990)
 Penang, Malaysia (1991)
 Västra Götaland County, Sweden (1998)
 Aguascalientes, México (2013)

In popular culture
Stephen Sondheim's stage musical Pacific Overtures, about the "opening" of Japan to Western influence by Commodore Perry, contains the song "Welcome to Kanagawa".
The main team in the Japanese manga and anime series Slam Dunk, Shohoku, is from Kanagawa.
The Hinata Inn and surrounding town from the manga and anime series Love Hina are located in Kanagawa.
The Japanese manga series Elfen Lied takes place in Kanagawa, mainly in Kamakura and Enoshima (Fujisawa).
The Japanese anime series S-CRY-ED takes place in Kanagawa Prefecture, after a seismic event raises it from the ground.
The Japanese manga and anime series Kenkō Zenrakei Suieibu Umishō takes place in the fictional Kanagawa city of Umineko.
The Japanese anime series Gundam Wing'''s early episodes feature Kanagawa prominently, mainly Yokohama and Yokosuka.
The Japanese anime and manga series Area no Kishi takes place in Kanagawa, mostly Kamakura.
The Japanese anime and manga series Anonymous Noise takes place in Kanagawa, mostly Kamakura (Kamakura Yuigahama Beach).
The Japanese anime and manga series Hamatora takes place in Kanagawa, mainly in Yokohama.
The Japanese anime and manga series His and Her Circumstances takes place in Kanagawa Prefecture, mainly in Kawasaki city and Yokohama.
The Japanese anime and manga series Neon Genesis Evangelion takes place in Tokyo-3, which is located in the village of Hakone, in the Ashigarashimo District
A team from the Japanese anime and manga series Kuroko's Basketball, Kaijo, is from Kanagawa.
The manga Shonan Junai Gumi, along with its prequel Bad Company, and the sequel Great Teacher Onizuka's spin off GTO: 14 Days in Shonan, are set in Shonan, in Kanagawa
The Japanese anime and manga series Yowamushi Pedal, Hakone Academy is from Hakone, Kanagawa.
The Japanese anime and manga series Initial D Fifth Stage is set in Kanagawa, and Final Stage is set in Hakone.
The Japanese anime and manga series Bungo Stray Dogs is set in Yokohama.
The Japanese anime and manga series Aoi Hana is set in Kamakura.
The Japanese anime and manga series Rascal Does Not Dream of Bunny Girl Senpai takes place in various places in Kanagawa Prefecture, such as Fujisawa and Yokohama.
The Japanese anime and manga series Astro Fighter Sunred is set in Kanagawa Prefecture, specifically Kawasaki City and the area around the Tama River.

See also

 Politics of Kanagawa

 Citations 

 General references 
 Hammer, Joshua (2006). Yokohama Burning: The Deadly 1923 Earthquake and Fire that Helped Forge the Path to World War II''. New York: Simon & Schuster. ; .
 Nussbaum, Louis-Frédéric and Käthe Roth (2005). Japan Encyclopedia. Cambridge: Harvard University Press. ; .

External links

 Kanagawa Prefecture Official Website 
 Kanagawa Prefecture Tourism Website 
 

 
Kantō region
Prefectures of Japan